The following list includes all of the Canadian Register of Historic Places listings in North Okanagan Regional District, British Columbia.

North Okanagan Regional District
H